Frank Anderson (born February 14, 1959) is an American college baseball coach and former outfielder. He is the pitching coach at the University of Tennessee. Anderson played college baseball at Mid-Plains Junior College from 1979 to 1980 and University of Nebraska at Kearney from 1981 to 1982. He served as the head coach at Oklahoma State University from 2004 to 2013.

Early life
A native of Grant, Nebraska, Anderson graduated from Emporia State University in Emporia, Kansas in 1983 and received his master's degree from the school in 1985. Prior to attending ESU, Anderson was a junior college All-American at Mid-Plains College in North Platte, Nebraska, and then an All-District and All-Area outfielder at University of Nebraska at Kearney.

Career
Upon completing his bachelor's degree in physical education, Anderson began his coaching career at Emporia State while working on his master's in science with an emphasis in exercise physiology. He helped the Hornets reach the 1984 NAIA World Series and then accepted the assistant coaching position at Howard College in Big Spring, Texas, in 1987. Over his three seasons there, the Hawks not only ranked among the top 20 junior colleges in the country, but also had 26 of Anderson’s pupils drafted by major league clubs.

Prior to serving as head coach for the Cowboys, Anderson was an assistant coach for the Texas Longhorns from 2000 to 2003 and pitching coach with the Texas Tech Red Raiders from 1990 to 1999.

At Oklahoma State, Anderson's team won the 2004 Big 12 Conference baseball tournament. In 2005, his team went 34–25, including an upset over the top ranked Texas Longhorns. In 2006, OSU went 41–20, and earned a number 1 seed in the NCAA tournament. His program reached a national ranking of 12th.  In his final four seasons he had an overall record of 130–100 overall (44–58 in the Big 12). After his team failed to qualify for the NCAA tournament, Anderson was fired on May 29, 2012.  In July 2012, Anderson was hired as the pitching coach for the Houston Cougars. On June 14, 2017, it was announced that Anderson would become the pitching coach for the Tennessee Volunteers.

Frank Anderson and his wife Sandra have two children: a son, Brett, who is a starting pitcher in Major League Baseball, and a daughter, Katelyn.

Division I Head Coaching record

References

External links
Frank Anderson Biography at Oklahoma State Cowboy Baseball official website.

Emporia State University alumni
Emporia State Hornets baseball coaches
Nebraska–Kearney Lopers baseball players
Howard Hawks baseball coaches
Junior college baseball players in the United States
Houston Cougars baseball coaches
Oklahoma State Cowboys baseball coaches
Texas Longhorns baseball coaches
Texas Tech Red Raiders baseball coaches
Living people
1959 births
People from Grant, Nebraska